Shkorpilovtsi is a small village and sea resort in Dolni Chiflik Municipality on the Bulgarian Black Sea Coast, located only 100 m away from one of the beaches on the Moesian Black Sea Coast. Its proximity to the sea capital of Bulgaria, Varna, makes it a preferred holiday destination for many Bulgarian and foreign tourists.

The resort was named after the Czech–Bulgarian archaeologist brothers Karel and Hermann Škorpil, long-time citizens of Varna.

References
http://www.guide-bulgaria.com/NE/varna/dolni_chiflik/shkorpilovtsi

Villages in Varna Province
Seaside resorts in Bulgaria
Populated coastal places in Bulgaria